Arthur Wynne (1871–1945) was the British-born inventor of the modern crossword puzzle. Arthur Wynne may also refer to:

Arthur Wynne (British Army officer) (1846–1936), British general
Arthur Beavor Wynne (1837–1906), Anglo-Irish geologist

See also
Arthur Wynn (1910–2001), British civil servant, social researcher, and recruiter of Soviet spies for the KGB
Arthur Wynne Foot (1838–1900), Irish doctor, professor of medicine, and entomologist
John Arthur Wynne (1801–1865), Irish landowner and politician